is a Japanese four-panel comic strip manga written and illustrated by Tae Sano. The manga was originally published in the March 2007 issue of Takeshobo's Manga Life magazine, and later moved to Takeshobo's Manga Life Momo and Manga Club magazines. The first tankōbon volume was released in January 2009; as of December 2014, nine volumes have been published. An original video animation by Studio Gram was bundled with volume three of the manga in February 2011, with an extended version released separately in March 2011. An anime television series, instead animated by Seven, aired in Japan on KBS Kyoto between July and December 2011.

Characters

The protagonist of the series. She is often silent as she spends too much time thinking about what to say. She often tries to follow advice given to her by her mother, though this is often misinterpreted by her classmates.

Mayu's best friend who is really chatty. She often gets lots of crushes on boys but usually ends up alone.

Another of Mayu's friends who enjoys sweets. She has a crush on Ritsuki.

A shy young girl. Though she wishes to make friends with Morita she often cannot due to the way Morita-san stares which she describes as "soulless", and the aura Morita gives while concentrating. She has very curly blonde hair which she is self conscious over, on various occasions apologizing to Morita-san whom often gets her fingers tangled in Hana's hair. Her mother and grandmother don't get along very well.

A tall long haired girl who is popular amongst the girls, often receiving many confessions. Despite her calm nature, she sometimes mispronounces her wording when under pressure, leading to some huge misunderstandings.

 A rather unknown character which on various occasions appears hiding around corners. She appears to have some sort of interest in Morita-san and has a habit on constantly trying to surprise her which often ends badly.

Mayu's mother, who was the one who gave her advice on manners, although the context in which these lessons were given generally involved confronting her husband about flirting with other women.

Mayu's father, who often finds himself on the receiving end of Yumi's anger due to his constant nights out.
 

A pair of boys in Mayu's class who often view her interactions with her friends as some kind of yuri scenario.

Mayu's cousin who is a bit shameless around her.

Media

Manga
Morita-san wa Mukuchi began as a four-panel comic strip manga written and illustrated by Tae Sano. The manga originally appeared in the March 2007 issue of Takeshobo's Manga Life magazine. Guest publications also appeared in the July 2007 issue of Takeshobo's Manga Life Momo magazine, the November 2007 issue of Manga Life, and the December 2007 issue of Takeshobo's Manga Club magazine. The manga began regular serialization from the October 2007 issue of Manga Life Momo, though again appeared as a guest publication in the January 2009 issue of Manga Life. A concurrent serialization of the manga began in the March 2009 issue of Manga Club. The first tankōbon volume was published by Takeshobo on December 27, 2008; as of December 27, 2014, nine volumes have been released. The series has been released in English on the JManga reader site.

Anime
An original video animation DVD produced by Studio Gram was bundled with the limited edition of the third manga volume sold on February 26, 2011. An extended version was released by itself on March 25, 2011. The second OVA features two pieces of theme music: one opening theme and one ending theme. The opening theme is  sung by Kana Hanazawa and Haruka Tomatsu, and the ending theme is  sung by Yoshino Nanjō and Saori Hayami. A single containing the theme songs was released on March 25, 2011.

An anime television series, animated by Seven, aired in Japan between July 6 and December 26, 2011, and was also simulcast by Crunchyroll. Two bonus episodes were released with the fifth volume of the manga in January 2012.

References

External links
Official website 

2007 manga
2011 anime OVAs
2011 anime television series debuts
2011 Japanese television series endings
Anime series based on manga
Comedy anime and manga
Seinen manga
Seven (animation studio)
Slice of life anime and manga
Takeshobo manga
Yonkoma